Muli Road railway station is a  railway station on the Western Railway network in the state of Gujarat, India. Muli Road railway station is 22 km far away from Surendranagar railway station. Three Passenger and an Express trains halt here.

Nearby stations 

Ramparda is the nearest railway station towards , whereas Digsar is the nearest railway station towards .

Trains 

The following Express train halt at Muli Road railway station in both directions:

 19217/18 Bandra Terminus - Jamnagar Saurashtra Janata Express

References

See also
 Surendranagar district

Surendranagar district
Rajkot railway division